Love Stinks is the ninth studio album by American rock band The J. Geils Band. The album was released on January 28, 1980 by EMI Records.

The title song, "Love Stinks" is a rant against unrequited love. It has been covered by industrial metal band Bile, by Andru Branch in the film Love Stinks, Joan Jett in the film Mr. Wrong and Adam Sandler in the film The Wedding Singer.

Cash Box said that the single "Just Can't Wait" has "earthy old wave rock guitar riffing, with a souped up synthesized farfisa organ sound." Record World called it "certified boogie music with a hook that will grab summer listeners."

Track listing
All songs written by Peter Wolf and Seth Justman, except where noted.

Personnel
Peter Wolf – lead vocals
J. Geils – guitar
Magic Dick – harmonica
Seth Justman – keyboards, backing vocals
Danny Klein – bass
Stephen Jo Bladd – drums

Production
Producer: Seth Justman
Engineer: David Thoener
Mixing: David Thoener
Mastering: Joe Brescio
Studio assistant: Jesse Henderson
Arranger: Seth Justman
Art direction: Carin Goldberg
Design: Carin Goldberg, Mark Handel
Photography: Cadence Industries Corp.

Charts
Album

Singles

References

1980 albums
The J. Geils Band albums
EMI Records albums
Albums recorded at Long View Farm
Albums produced by Seth Justman